Alfredo Rodrigues da Motta (12 January 1921 – 22 April 1998) was a Brazilian basketball player, who competed in the 1948 Summer Olympics in London, United Kingdom. There he won the bronze medal with the men's national team. He was born in Rio de Janeiro.

References

External links
 
 CBB profile
 databaseOlympics profile

1921 births
1998 deaths
Brazilian men's basketball players
1954 FIBA World Championship players
Olympic basketball players of Brazil
Basketball players at the 1948 Summer Olympics
Basketball players at the 1951 Pan American Games
Flamengo basketball players
Olympic bronze medalists for Brazil
Basketball players from Rio de Janeiro (city)
Olympic medalists in basketball
Medalists at the 1948 Summer Olympics
Pan American Games bronze medalists for Brazil
CR Vasco da Gama basketball players
Pan American Games medalists in basketball
Medalists at the 1951 Pan American Games
1950 FIBA World Championship players